İskenderun station is the main railway station in the city of İskenderun, Turkey. The bus station is to the south west and the harbor is to the north of the station. İskenderun is a port city in the Hatay Province and the station is the southern terminus of the Toprakkale-İskenderun branch line which connects the province to the main line between Adana and Gaziantep. The line was opened to service in 1913 during the Ottoman Empire era. 

The station briefly appears in the movie Indiana Jones and the Last Crusade.

Trains 
The majority of the trains using İskenderun station are freight trains. The main passenger train is between Mersin and İskenderun  with 21 stops in between. some of the important stops are; Dörtyol, Ceyhan, Adana and Tarsus.

References 

Railway stations in Hatay Province
Buildings and structures in Hatay Province
İskenderun
Railway stations opened in 1913
1913 establishments in the Ottoman Empire